John Jacob Farrow (November 8, 1853 – December 31, 1914), also known as Jack, was an American Major League Baseball player who played catcher in two seasons in the National Association of Professional Base Ball Players, and one season in the majors, with the 1884 Brooklyn Atlantics.  Farrow died in Perth Amboy, New Jersey at the age of 61, and is interred at Holy Sepulchre Cemetery in East Orange, New Jersey.

References

External links

 

1853 births
1914 deaths
Baseball players from New York (state)
Major League Baseball catchers
19th-century baseball players
Elizabeth Resolutes players
Brooklyn Atlantics players
Brooklyn Atlantics (AA) players
New York Metropolitans (minor league) players
Brooklyn Grays (Interstate Association) players
Newark Domestics players
Burials at Holy Sepulchre Cemetery (East Orange, New Jersey)